Felimida punctilucens is a species of colorful sea slug, a dorid nudibranch, a marine gastropod mollusk in the family Chromodorididae.

Description
The maximum recorded body length is 35 mm.

Habitat
Minimum recorded depth is 68 m. Maximum recorded depth is 68 m.

References

External links

Chromodorididae
Gastropods described in 1890